The Independent Battalion of New York Volunteer Infantry, also known as German Legion or New York Corps of Light Infantry, was an infantry battalion from New York City that served in the Union Army during the American Civil War. It was formed in April 1862; originally as Enfants Perdu Regiment but was immediately downgraded to a battalion as it couldn't muster enough companies. The unit served in the Carolinas for the duration of its existence. It was disbanded in January 1864; the men being transferred to the 47th and 48th infantry regiments and to the 1st Engineer Regiment.

Organisation
The battalion initially fielded only 6 companies, thus not serving as regiment, and stayed a battalion despite mustering additional companies over time in 1862 and 1863.

Company A – Cpt. Joseph Torrens
Company B – Cpt. Jules F. Rochefort
Company C – Cpt. Joseph Schmidt Kraus
Company D – Cpt. Charles Daillet
Company E – Cpt. Francois Boucher
Company F – Cpt. Michael Schmidt
Company G – Cpt. Thaddedus Ferris
Company H – Cpt. Ferdinand Levy (1862)
Company I – Cpt. John G. Gundlack
Company K – Cpt. Ferdinand Levy (1863)

Commanders
Lieutenant Colonel Felix Confort (resigned May 9, 1863)
Lieutenant Colonel Simon Levy

Casualties
During its service the battalion lost 9 enlisted men killed and mortally wounded and 52 enlisted men by disease, for a total of 61 men.

See also
List of New York Civil War units

References

Units and formations of the Union Army from New York (state)
1862 establishments in New York (state)
Military units and formations established in 1862
Military units and formations disestablished in 1864